Vatican Nitez is an album by Global Goon released on Rephlex Records.

Track listing
 "Business Man"  – 3:28
 "Jerky Dharma"  – 3:47
 "On The 73"  – 4:54
 "Kreem Ballet"  – 5:35
 "Ray Krebs Drives A Car"  – 1:28
 "Stan's Slaves"  – 3:30
 "!"  – 3:09
 "Crudulus"  – 1:17
 "Drugula"  – 2:29
 "Scott Cronce Is The CEO"  – 4:22
 "Globy Dubes, Champeen Of All Americky"  – 5:13

References 

2002 albums
Global Goon albums
Rephlex Records albums